Dietz Computer Systems was a German minicomputer manufacturer with its main office in Mülheim an der Ruhr, Germany. 

The systems were used for industrial and business data processing, as well as for technical and scientific purposes. A popular computer-aided design software, Technovision, ran on the systems produced by Dietz.

References

Computer hardware companies of Germany
Companies based in North Rhine-Westphalia
Defunct computer companies of Germany